Ferrybank GAA is a Gaelic Athletic Association (GAA) club based in Waterford City, Republic of Ireland.  It is situated in the suburb of Ferrybank on the north bank of the River Suir. There have been Gaelic games played in Ferrybank since the first team known as the Davis's was formed in the early 1890s. The club, under its present guise, was formed in 1950, and celebrated its 50th anniversary in the year 2000.

The club caters for boys and girls from the age of 5 years and upwards. At juvenile level, the club were U-14 and U-16 County Champions in hurling in 2007 and teams are fielded at all juvenile grades. At adult level in hurling, the club fields teams at intermediate and minor levels.  In Gaelic football, the club were Waterford Junior Champions in 2007.

Honours

 Waterford Senior Hurling Championships: (3): 1915, 1916, 1919
 Waterford Intermediate Hurling Championships: (1): 1968
 Waterford Intermediate Football Championships (1): 1978 
 Waterford Junior Football Championships (2): 1977, 2008

References

Gaelic games clubs in County Waterford
Hurling clubs in County Waterford
Gaelic football clubs in County Waterford